Greenpark may refer to:

 Greenpark Racecourse, a former racecourse in Limerick, Ireland
 Green Park Business Park, Reading, United Kingdom

See also
 Green Park (disambiguation)